Ans du Roy Richard II., hors des les Abridgments de Statham, Fitzherbert et Brooke is the title of a collection of law reports, compiled by Richard Bellewe, of cases decided between approximately 1378 and 1400. For the purpose of citation their name may be abbreviated to "Bel". They are reprinted in volume 72 of the English Reports.

In 1847, J. G. Marvin said:

References
Ans du Roy Richard II., hors des les Abridgments de Statham, Fitzherbert et Brooke. 16mo. London. 1585.

External links
Statham, N and Fitzherbert, A and Brooke, R and Bellewe, R. Les ans du roy Richard le Second. 1585. Reprinted by Steven and Haynes in 1869. Digitised copy from Google Books.

Sets of reports reprinted in the English Reports